Coprinellus domesticus, commonly known as the firerug inkcap, is a species of mushroom in the family Psathyrellaceae. First described as Agaricus domesticus by James Bolton in 1788, it was later known as Coprinus domesticus before it was transferred to the genus Coprinellus in 2001.

Ozonium 

The firerug inkcap gets its name from the bright orange carpet of hyphae grown around the mushroom. The covering is known as an ozonium, which resembles an aboveground mycelium. The ozonium is not always present, however, and can also grow in the absence of any mushrooms. Additionally, Coprinellus radians is identical in every aspect except for its larger spore size. These are the only two species that are known to form this ozonium.

References

domesticus
Fungi described in 1788